Aymen Barkok (born 21 May 1998) is a professional footballer who plays as a midfielder for Bundesliga club Mainz 05. Born in Germany, he plays for the Morocco national team.

Club career
On 20 October 2016, Barkok, previously playing with the under-19s, signed his first professional contract with Frankfurt, lasting until 2020.

Barkok made his professional debut for Eintracht Frankfurt in the Bundesliga on 20 November 2016 in an away match against Werder Bremen, coming on for Mijat Gaćinović in the 75th minute. Barkok went on to score the winning goal for Frankfurt in the final minute of the game, with the match finishing as a 2–1 victory.

On 19 May 2018, Barkok joined Bundesliga newcomers Fortuna Düsseldorf on loan for the 2018–19 season.

On 31 January 2022, Mainz 05 announced that Barkok signed a three-year contract with the club, beginning on 1 July 2022.

International career
Barkok was born in Germany. He is a former youth international for Germany. He switched allegiances to represent his home country, Morocco national team. He debuted for them in a friendly 3–1 win over Senegal on 9 October 2020.

Honours
Eintracht Frankfurt 
 DFB-Pokal: 2017–18
 UEFA Europa League: 2021–22

Individual
 Fritz Walter Medal U19 Silver: 2017

References

External links

Profile at the 1. FSV Mainz 05 website 

1998 births
Living people
Footballers from Frankfurt
Moroccan footballers
Morocco international footballers
German footballers
Germany under-21 international footballers
Germany youth international footballers
German people of Moroccan descent
Association football midfielders
Eintracht Frankfurt players
Fortuna Düsseldorf players
1. FSV Mainz 05 players
Bundesliga players
2021 Africa Cup of Nations players
UEFA Europa League winning players